State Route 515 (SR 515) is a  four-lane C-shaped state highway in the northern part of the U.S. state of Georgia. It uses a blue state route designation because it is part of the Appalachian Development Highway System. It begins just west of Nelson. It curves to the northeast to Lake Chatuge, where it heads north to the North Carolina state line. The highway was built to give motorists in the north Georgia mountains better access to Atlanta and its outlying suburbs, as opposed to the old SR 5 and U.S. Route 76 (US 76) highways, which this project replaced. 

SR 515 is also known as the Zell Miller Mountain Parkway, in honor of Zell Miller, elected as Georgia governor and U.S. senator. It is one of the Georgia Department of Transportation's Governor's Road Improvement Program (GRIP) corridors. The highway is known for mountain views all along its route. SR 515 is part of the Appalachian Development Highway System's Corridor A, and is known as the "APD Highway." The highway was designated in 1989.

Route description

SR 515 begins just west of Nelson and just north of the Cherokee-Pickens County line, at the convergence of the northern terminus of Interstate 575, SR 5, the northern terminus of SR 5 Business, and the northern terminus of SR 372. It is concurrent with SR 5 from its southern terminus to Blue Ridge. It is also concurrent with US 76 from East Ellijay to a point between Young Harris and Hiawassee. It maintains a fairly strict south-north routing from its southern terminus to Blue Ridge and then becomes a due east-west route for the remainder of its length.

SR 515 is a significant route for the north Georgia mountains, funneling tourist traffic and serving as a growth corridor. SR 515 sees an Average Annual Daily Traffic (AADT) of more than 10,000 vehicles south of Blue Ridge, and at least 5,000 on the entirety of the route.

The entire length of SR 515, including the concurrent sections, is part of the National Highway System, a system of routes determined to be the most important for the nation's economy, mobility and defense.

History

The road that would eventually become numbered as SR 515 was established at least by 1919 along nearly the same alignment as it travels today. At the time, it was numbered as SR 5 from Nelson to Ellijay, SR 2 and possibly 5 from Ellijay to Blue Ridge, and SR 2 from Blue Ridge to the Young Harris area. The entire route was paved by this time. In 1989, SR 515 was signed along its entire length.

Major intersections

See also

References

External links

515
Transportation in Pickens County, Georgia
Transportation in Gilmer County, Georgia
Transportation in Fannin County, Georgia
Transportation in Union County, Georgia
Transportation in Towns County, Georgia
Chattahoochee-Oconee National Forest
Appalachian Development Highway System